Verónica Abigail Colindres García (born July 9, 1986 in Opico, La Libertad) is a female Salvadoran race walker. She won a silver medal for the 20 km at the 2009 Pan American Race Walking Cup in San Salvador, with a time of 1:39:45.

Colindres represented El Salvador at the 2008 Summer Olympics in Beijing, where she competed in the women's 20 km race walk. She finished and completed the race in thirty-eighth place by six seconds behind Brazil's Tânia Spindler, with a seasonal best time of 1:36:52. Colindres was elevated to a higher position, when Greek race walker and former Olympic champion Athanasía Tsoumeléka had been disqualified from the competition, after she was tested positive for CERA, an advanced version of the blood-booster erythropoietin (EPO).

References

External links

NBC 2008 Olympics profile

1986 births
Living people
People from La Libertad Department (El Salvador)
Salvadoran female racewalkers
Olympic athletes of El Salvador
Athletes (track and field) at the 2008 Summer Olympics